TeleRadyo (previously known as DZMM TeleRadyo and known on-air as ABS-CBN TeleRadyo) is a Philippine pay television channel owned by the ABS-CBN Corporation under the ABS-CBN News and Current Affairs brand, and is available on cable providers throughout the Philippines. TeleRadyo was also included as a digital subchannel on digital terrestrial television seen via the ABS-CBN TVplus digital TV receivers and other digital TV boxes, until its discontinuation on November 1, 2022. TeleRadyo is also simulcasted via The Filipino Channel (TFC) and it can be heard and viewed online via TeleRadyo's YouTube channel, ABS-CBN Radio Service App (Audio Streaming) and iWantTFC. The channel was previously used to simulcast the programs of ABS-CBN's flagship AM radio station, DZMM 630. At 8:20 PM (local time) on May 5, 2020, the station went off the air due to a cease and desist order of the National Telecommunications Commission together with ABS-CBN, S+A, and MOR Philippines. After DZMM 630 kHz was shut down, DZMM TeleRadyo was renamed simply as TeleRadyo. Although it also went off-air a few minutes after, the channel went back on-air and online on May 8, 2020, resuming the programming of the former DZMM. On June 28, 2021, TeleRadyo launched a high-definition feed on YouTube and Facebook while selected shows are being broadcast on Kapamilya Channel and The Filipino Channel in HD.

An international feed called TeleRadyo Global is also available worldwide as part of TFC premium channels via cable, satellite, iWantTFC and TFC IPTV.

Description

DZMM TeleRadyo features a simulcast of DZMM's radio programs as well as live video feed of the radio booth itself. As a result, viewers can hear DZMM 630, and see the people currently in the studio speaking on air, or in the case of special live occasions, live video footage simulcasted on the radio station can be also seen with a clearer audio provided from the feed. Radio shows that have music aired on this station will be supplemented with pictures of artists (during Yesterday and Remember When) or random pictures instead of the studio scenes on selected programs. Moonlight Serenade is also a music program, however it only shows random pictures instead of artist's pictures while the song is playing. Content during commercial breaks are separate from advertisements in the radio feed which currently shows promotions for TeleRadyo and other ABS-CBN channels and becomes full-screen on datascreen, or disappears on full-screen graphical format during non-produced advertisements. The channel, however, simulcasts the Three O' Clock prayer and the station ID, as well as station's sign-on and sign-off messages depending on the broadcast content.

In some cases when the radio feed will air programming only dedicated to theirs like the UAAP men's basketball Finals coverage from 2013 to 2014 and during the PiliPinas Debates 2016 (presidential debates in Cagayan de Oro (GMA) and Cebu (TV5), and the vice-presidential debate, aired on CNN Philippines), regular-scheduled programming will continue for TeleRadyo viewers until the coverage for radio ends.

The timing with TeleRadyo and the radio feed can depend on the factors. The TeleRadyo can be delayed at seven seconds in Metro Manila if the radio feed is heard using the 630 frequency via AM radio, while it would be more advanced by 3 seconds or more when the radio feed is heard via online streaming.

Since June 19, 2017, DZMM set-up an additional studio set for its radio programs such as Sakto, Good Vibes, Todo-Todo Walang Preno and On The Spot as part of the station's plans to convert into a full-fledged news channel in the future. Since October 26, 2020, Sakto is currently the only news program to use this studio.

As of March 18, 2020, DZMM 630 and TeleRadyo begin to share channel space with its sister English-language news network ABS-CBN News Channel as part of larger ABS-CBN News coverage of the COVID-19 pandemic every Tuesdays, Thursdays and Sundays; with ANC's relay of DZMM programs on Mondays, Wednesdays, Fridays and Saturdays. This arrangement ended on April 20, however ANC hook up on TeleRadyo continues during overnight graveyard slot.

On June 26, 2021, TeleRadyo unveiled new lower-third graphics as the channel migrated to high-definition television broadcast online. However, the channel feed still uses an 4:3 aspect ratio, but is stretched in an anamorphic vision format.

Programming

As mentioned above, TeleRadyo primarily simulcasts programs from its radio counterpart, AM-630 kHz, excluding its advertising (including sponsorship for introducing a report or timecheck) and sometimes, its station ID and the Three O'Clock prayer which depends on the broadcast content. Also, the channel and its radio counterpart briefly sign-off the air every Sundays from 10:30 pm to every Mondays at 4:00 am (with an exception where both needed for the overnight news coverage for special events or most dire situations). It simulcasts the sign-on and sign-off audio notices from the radio station, but showing a loop of the TeleRadyo's logo animation for its viewers. The TeleRadyo test card is then placed in full screen when no programming content is present during the sign-off window hours.

However, TeleRadyo also broadcasts its own breakaway schedule. This happens when the programme broadcast on AM-630 kHz is prerecorded. Programming produced by TeleRadyo are MMK Klasiks (a program featuring MMK episodes from the past, mostly from 1996 until early 2000 episodes; replacing the pre-recorded radio only MMK sa DZMM, but later moved to its new timeslot, first pre-empting the first 30 minutes of Dr. Love: Always and Forever, and currently pre-empting the last 30 minutes of Usapang de Campanilla, which effectively pre-empt the latter in its entirety) and the television-only segment of MMDA (and Go Manila) Metro Traffic Live. Headline Pilipinas previously aired exclusively on TeleRadyo, but following programming changes, it began simulcasting on the AM counterpart on June 16, 2017, moving the radio-only MMK sa DZMM to a later timeslot.

ABS-CBN News and Current Affairs late night programming (branded as Pinoy True Stories, but not mentioned on air) are also broadcast to this channel at 10:00 pm (formerly at 9:30 pm). This NCA late night block airs first on this channel and its radio counterpart, before airing it on the mother network ABS-CBN after Bandila at around midnight. Previously from 2011 to 2012, NCA programming also aired on the channel (but not under Pinoy True Stories) including S.O.C.O. at 9:15pm replacing 45 minutes of Usapang de Campanilla.

ABS-CBN weekend programs (Rated K, Matanglawin, Ipaglaban Mo!, S.O.C.O., and Kuha Mo!) are aired at the 2:00 pm slot, replacing MMK sa DZMM and Wow Trending (which airs on the radio station). Replays of ABS-CBN's late-night and weekend programming are aired from 1:00 am to 2:30 am Tuesday to Saturday, pre-empting Moonlight Serenade for one and a half hour, relegating the latter music program to the AM counterpart for the first one and a half hour before TeleRadyo joins for the rest of the program.

In addition, an early edition of ABS-CBN's late night newscast Bandila was aired at 10:00 pm on DZMM 630 AM and DZMM TeleRadyo, while Bandila's main edition continues to air on ABS-CBN weeknights, right after Tonight with Boy Abunda. The program was discontinued on May 10, 2019.

MMK Klasiks and ABS-CBN's weekend programs are exclusive programs to DZMM TeleRadyo and are not being broadcast on DZMM Radyo Patrol 630 itself.

Just as with ABS-CBN News Channel, in case of developing stories, sudden breaking news or even important or scheduled live coverage, DZMM TeleRadyo pre-empts its regularly scheduled programming to give way for the developing news stories and/or coverage as it happens. Regular scheduled programs resume once the coverage of an important event has ended.

COVID-19 pandemic and ABS-CBN shutdown

Due to skeletal workforce imposed by the network due to the COVID-19 pandemic, DZMM TeleRadyo and Radyo Patrol 630 began to simulcast ANC newscasts and programs on some days and vice versa on other days for the coverage from March 19, 2020. However, the simulcast for the radio counterpart would break-away with a simulcast of MOR 101.9 on 10:00 PM until 4:30 AM. On April 1, given the decision to vacate the studios for the self-quarantine of many of the staff and the disinfection measures after being exposed to two PUIs, the channel provisionally broadcast ANC programming round the clock (with a 10pm breakaway for radio as it had been the case). Regular broadcasts resumed a day later on April 2.

On May 5, 2020, DZMM TeleRadyo rebranded simply as TeleRadyo after the National Telecommunications Commission (NTC) issued a cease-and-desist order against its radio counterpart and other ABS-CBN free TV and radio stations nationwide. The last program to air on May 5 was S.R.O., which was supposed to air until 11:00 pm (PST) but ended broadcasts at 8:20 pm instead. Most DZMM TeleRadyo programming resumed on May 8 at 5:00 am (PST) where the old DZMM TeleRadyo logo appeared as a secondary logo (and as a bumper logo) beginning midday, with the TeleRadyo logo being primary.

On May 10, 2020, its refurbished logo and bumper began to be used full-time replacing the old logos and bumper.

On May 15, 2020, ANC stopped its simulcast with TeleRadyo and it was replaced by the replay episodes of Todo-Todo Walang Preno (from 11:00 pm to 12:00 mn), Good Vibes (from 12:00 mn to 1:00 am), Failon Ngayon (from 1:00 am to 3:00 am), and Lingkod Kapamilya (from 3:00 am to 5:30 am). The said channel's simulcast resumed in 2021.

On May 16 to 17, 2020, TV Patrol Weekend (from 10:00 pm to 11:00 pm), Usapang Kalye (from 11:00 pm to 12:00 mn), Lima at Logan: Tandem (from 12:00 mn to 1:00 am), Konsyumer Atbp. (from 1:00 am to 2:30 am), Omaga-Diaz Report (from 2:30 am to 3:30 am), Good Job (from 3:30 am to 5:00 am) and Kape at Salita (from 5:00 am to 6:00 am), started replaying episodes on TeleRadyo as well.

On May 27, 2020, the channel's primary bumper was updated.

Return to digital television 
On May 27, 2022, TeleRadyo returned on digital free TV via ZOE TV's digital channel space, coinciding with the second year anniversary of the rebrand, albeit its broadcast hours are from 5:30 am to 10:00 pm on Weekdays and 6:00 am to 10:00 pm on Weekends (PST), due to their subchannel rental agreement with ZOE Broadcasting Network with its official launch on June 1, 2022. TeleRadyo's 24-hour broadcast still remains on cable, satellite, iWantTFC, TFC, and TFC IPTV (while airing their 2006 version of the Philippine National Anthem every Monday mornings at 5:30 am (PST)).

After 5 months, TeleRadyo was pulled out on digital free TV for the second time effective November 1, 2022 after ABS-CBN and ZOE decided not to renew their licensing contract for the airing of the channel as one of A2Z's digital subchannels. It was subsequently replaced by Light TV.

See also
 A2Z
 ABS-CBN (inactive channel)
 Kapamilya Channel
 DZMM Radyo Patrol 630 (ABS-CBN's flagship AM radio station)
 ABS-CBN News and Current Affairs (ABS-CBN's news division)
 ABS-CBN News Channel (a 24-hour English-language cable news channel)

References

External links
 
 Program schedule

ABS-CBN News and Current Affairs
Radyo Patrol
24-hour television news channels in the Philippines
Television networks in the Philippines
Filipino-language television stations
Assets owned by ABS-CBN Corporation
ABS-CBN Corporation channels
Internet radio stations in the Philippines
Television channels and stations established in 2007
2007 establishments in the Philippines